John McDonald is an American bobsledder who competed in the late 1940s. He won a bronze medal in the two-man event at the 1949 FIBT World Championships in Lake Placid, New York.

References
Bobsleigh two-man world championship medalists since 1931

American male bobsledders
Possibly living people
Year of birth missing